Phronima sedentaria is a species of amphipod crustaceans found in oceans at a depth of up to . They are large in size relative to other members of the family Phronimidae. Individuals may be found inside barrel-like homes, created most commonly from the tunics of select species of tunicate, where they rear their young. P. sedentaria is known to employ multiple feeding strategies and other interesting behaviors, including daily vertical migration. The species is also known by the more common names “pram bug” and “barrel shrimp.”

Description
Phronima sedentaria is the largest and most abundant species in the family Phronimidae. Sexual dimorphism is reflected between male and female members in the more extended and prominent antennae of the males relative to the short, reduced ones of females. More obviously, the size discrepancy between males and females distinguishes them further. Females measure up to 42 mm (1.7 in) long, while males are only 15 mm (0.6 in) long. This species also possesses a complex optical system which involves the use of two sets of compound eyes. Both sets use bundles of crystalline cones to process visual information: one set faces ventrally and one set faces dorsally.

Distribution
Phronima sedentaria is found in temperate, subtropical, and tropical waters of all the world's oceans, including the Mediterranean Sea. It is usually found in midwater pelagic habitats, but can be found migrating all the way to the surface.

Ecology
Phronima sedentaria most commonly exhibits a symbiotic relationship with tunicates of the genera Pyrosoma spp., Doliolum spp., and Salpa spp. It is not entirely certain how to classify the symbiotic relationship between P. sedentaria and its hosts, as instances of commensalism, parasitism, and predation have all been observed. However, some research has suggested that the majority of suborder Hyperiidea members exhibit parasitic behavior. Females of P. sedentaria live in the barrel-like bodies of salps, pyrosomes, and cnidarians, and use their strong pleopods to propel their homes through the water. They can somersault rapidly in their barrels, thus quickly changing direction. However, speed is reduced by a factor of three to four when swimming while inside a barrel compared to swimming without one. The shape of the barrel is generally asymmetrical, with one opening three times larger than that of the other.  In order to construct their barrels, females first locate a suitable salp, pyrosome, or cnidarian host and either cut into the host or enter through an existing opening. Once inside, the female consumes the organism within and carve out the gelatinous inside, leaving nothing but the tunic. The cells on the tunic layer may serve various functions for the P. sedentaria, including protection from UV light, storage of acid, and defense against microorganisms, like bacteria. In laboratory experiments with restricted access to potential hosts, females have additionally displayed competition for barrels.

While certain prey (salps, pyrosomes, and cnidaria) have additional uses for P. sedentaria in hosting their young and providing feeding platforms, the species is also carnivorous on zooplankton, krill, arrowworms, and other crustaceans. P. sedentaria use different feeding techniques depending on the food source, but the leading sets of pereiopods (front legs) are primarily used in all cases. Mouth pieces, such as the mandible, maxillipeds, and maxillae, manipulate the food into small pieces which are then able to fit through the esophagus. Feeding preferentially occurs at nighttime when members of this species undergo a vertical migration of around 200–350 meters to the ocean's surface. Research has shown this species is susceptible to temperature fluctuations outside of the range 8-25 degrees Celsius (46-77 degrees Fahrenheit), which explains the desire for cooler deep water (300–600 meters deep) throughout the day and warmer shallow waters (0–25 meters deep) at night. P. sedentaria typically migrate to hypoxic areas (such as the Oxygen Minimum Zone) during the day, causing low metabolic rates and physical activity.

Known predators of P. sedentaria include the longnose lancetfish, European flying squid, Pacific pomfret, albacore, and skipjack tuna.

Life cycle & development 

Female Phronima sedentaria are capable of producing up to 600 eggs at a time. Juveniles spend their early development within the mother in a specialized pouch called the marsupium. After finding a suitable host, the female begins to transform the barrel into a nursery for its young. She uses her pleopods and anterior pereiopods to remove offspring from the marsupium, while her posterior pereiopods maintain stability and grasp onto the barrel. Once inside, the young organize themselves into a medial ring around the interior of the barrel. This shape is maintained until the mother delivers food, which the offspring then feed on and return to formation afterwards. Young P. sedentaria use the barrel as another food source. The offspring of P. sedentaria develop within their barrel homes until reaching prematurity, after which they are able to feed and survive independently. Development is characterized by growth stages in which molting occurs. Each molt adds a new segment to the sets of pleopods in the rear. The emergence of sexual dimorphism occurs soon after prematurity.

References

Further reading

Hirose, E., Aoki, M. N., & Nishikawa, J. (2005). Still alive? Fine structure of the barrels made by Phronima (Crustacea: Amphipoda). Marine Biological Association of the United Kingdom. Journal of the Marine Biological Association of the United Kingdom, 85(6), 1435.
Iinuma, Y., Yamaguchi, S., Kato, M., Nakaguchi, K., Ohtsuka, S., & Wakabayashi, K. (2020). Evolutionary Modification of Pereopods in Phronimid Amphipods (Crustacea: Amphipoda: Hyperiidea: Phronimidae) Reflects Host Differences. The Biological Bulletin, 238(3), 167-179.
Nishikawa, J., Suzuki, Y. S., & Nishida, S. (2005). Immunochemical recognition of gelatinous zooplankton: an application to identify the origin of the ‘barrel’: made by the pelagic amphipod, Phronima sedentaria. Journal of the Marine Biological Association of the United Kingdom, 85(3), 635-639.
Preciado, I., Cartes, J. E., Punzón, A., Frutos, I., López-López, L., & Serrano, A. (2017). Food web functioning of the benthopelagic community in a deep-sea seamount based on diet and stable isotope analyses. Deep Sea Research Part II: Topical Studies in Oceanography, 137, 56-68.
Quigley, D.T.G., O'Dwyer, K., Flannery, U. and Flannery, K. 2015. The Pram Shrimp Phronima sedentaria (Forkal,1775) [Crustacea: Amphidopa: Hyperiidea: Phronimidae] in Irish waters and a review of its association with gelatinous zooplankton. Ir. Nat. J. 34(1) 1 - 7.

External links
Creature Feature: Pram Bug
Photos of Phronima sedentaria
Phronima Female and Young

Hyperiidea
Crustaceans described in 1775
Taxa named by Peter Forsskål